This is an index of lists of banned books, which contain books that have been banned or censored by religious authority or government.

By country

 Book censorship in Canada
 Book censorship in China
 List of books banned in India
 Book censorship in Iran
 List of authors banned in Nazi Germany
 List of books banned in New Zealand
 Book censorship in the Republic of Ireland
 Book censorship in the United States

By religious authority
 List of authors and works on the Index Librorum Prohibitorum

See also
 Book burning
 List of book-burning incidents
 Nazi book burnings
 Burning of books and burying of scholars
 Areopagitica; A speech of Mr. John Milton for the Liberty of Unlicenc'd Printing, to the Parlament of England
 Index Librorum Prohibitorum
 List of most commonly challenged books in the United States

References 

Lists of book lists
Lists of controversial books
Blacklisting
Lists of prohibited books